Orlean Historic District is a national historic district located at Orlean, Fauquier County, Virginia.  It encompasses 51 contributing buildings and 2 contributing sites in the rural village of Orlean.  The district includes commercial buildings, churches, a post office, a former school, and multiple residences and their ancillary outbuildings that date from the late 18th century to the mid-20th century.  Notable buildings include the Orlean Farm House (c. 1795), Smith-Hinkley House (c. 1830), the Anderson-Rector House and Store (c. 1870), the Greek Revival style Thorpe-Cornwell House, Jeffries Store (1885), Orlean Methodist Church (1881-1883), Providence Baptist Church (1883), and Orlean post office building (1956).

It was listed on the National Register of Historic Places in 2009.

Gallery

References

Historic districts in Fauquier County, Virginia
Federal architecture in Virginia
Greek Revival architecture in Virginia
National Register of Historic Places in Fauquier County, Virginia
Historic districts on the National Register of Historic Places in Virginia